Autosticha phaulodes is a moth in the family Autostichidae. It was described by Edward Meyrick in 1908. It is found in Sri Lanka.

The wingspan is 12–15 mm. The forewings are brownish-ochreous, irrorated (sprinkled) with fuscous and dark fuscous. The stigmata are moderate or large and dark fuscous, the plical somewhat before the first discal. There is a small pre-tornal spot of dark fuscous suffusion and an almost marginal series of dark fuscous dots along the posterior portion of the costa and termen. The hindwings are grey.

References

Moths described in 1908
Autosticha
Moths of Asia